The following is a list of locomotives of the London, Midland and Scottish Railway as of 31 December 1947.  This date is significant because nationalisation of the Big Four occurred the next day, 1 January 1948.  Thus this is the list of locomotives as inherited by British Railways.  At this time there were approximately 8,000 steam locomotives, 50 diesel locomotives and a handful of others.

Overview 
In addition to its own builds, the LMS still owned locomotives inherited from various constituent companies: the Caledonian Railway (CR), Furness Railway (FR), Glasgow and South Western Railway (G&SWR), Highland Railway (HR), London and North Western Railway (LNWR), London, Tilbury and Southend Railway (LT&SR), Lancashire and Yorkshire Railway (L&YR), Midland Railway (MR), and North London Railway (NLR).

The most numerous class at this point was, if Midland and LMS classes are combined, the 4F (192 MR, 5 S&DJR, 575 LMS), and the second (or without combination) the "Black Five" with 742 locomotives, there were also 623 8Fs, including 67 LNER Class O6 on hire.

The LMS numbered self-propelled vehicles (diesel railcars, EMUs) into the coaching stock series, with the exception of the L&YR Railmotors.

BR allocated numbers in March 1948 (in the meantime there were a few withdrawals and new construction).  Most ex-LMS engines had 40000 added to their numbers, but those with numbers over 20000 were renumbered in the 58xxx series to avoid the 6xxxx series used for ex-LNER locomotives.  The ex-MR 2F 0-6-0s that had not been rebuilt as 3Fs were also renumbered into that series, as were the Midland 1P 0-4-4T.  It then took a few years to renumber all the locomotives.

In terms of locomotive taxonomy, the LMS had a tendency to lump classes together (e.g. Sentinels, diesel shunters, ex-Midland 0-4-4Ts), but for clarity these have been split into subclasses where appropriate.

NB: This list is currently under construction.  The power classification given is the LMS power classification.  BR adopted the same system system-wide, but adapted it slightly.

Also, NCC engines and some departmental stock is missing.

British locomotives

Main series

Engineering Department series

ED No. 2

Wolverton Carriage Works series 

Wolverton Carriage Works had their own separately numbered series.  They had four ex-LNWR Special Tanks, Numbers 3, 6, 7 and 8.

Irish locomotives 

For completeness, Irish locomotives will be given here.

NCC broad gauge 

Class WT locomotives were built at Derby Works in England to the design of George Ivatt between 1946 and 1950. They were numbered 1–10 and 50–57. They were a tank engine version of the NCC Class W moguls. A tank engine did not require turning at termini and the LMS had produced a series of successful 2-6-4Ts. Like the LMS Fairburn 2-6-4T built at the same time, they had a hopper bunker and absence of plating ahead of the cylinders. They were based on the LMS Fowler 2-6-4T by Sir Henry Fowler.

In December 1962 locomotive No.50 received a boiler from one of the ex-NCC 2-6-0 tender locomotives, the boiler and firebox being overhauled and repaired at Derby.
In early 1966 and towards the end of their careers, the Class WT locomotives were involved in working notable traffic. This was on spoil trains that transported fill for motorway construction from the Blue Circle cement works at Magheramorne to Greencastle near Belfast. Three trains of twenty hopper wagons each were made up, with a Class WT locomotive at each end. Each train when filled carried 600 tons of rock and in all, some 7,600 trains had carried 4¼ million tons of material by the time the contract ended in May 1970.

The last of the Class WT locomotives were officially withdrawn in 1971 the last time one was in traffic being 22 October 1970. This made them the last steam locomotives in mainline operation in the British Isles; Córas Iompair Éireann steam in the Republic of Ireland having ended in 1962 and British Railways steam in Great Britain having finished in 1968.

One of these locomotives, No.4, has been preserved by the Railway Preservation Society of Ireland which operates it on special mainline trains. The RPSI is also looking at the possibility of building a new member of the class (No.58) to give them a second mainline tank locomotive considering the low availability of turntables on modern day lines. The last locomotives to work in the United Kingdom were two of these tank locomotives. They were nicknamed Jeeps by railway men due to their immense size.

Class W mogul 2-6-0 locomotives worked on the main Belfast to Dublin main line. Also work on the Lisburn to Antrim line. This included goods and passenger work as they were mixed traffic locomotives. Earl of Ulster no 97 was seen frequently on goods trains passing through Goraghwood railway station. They may also have worked ballast trains from Goraghwood quarry. No 100 Queen Elizabeth hauled a royal train in 1952. There is deep regret that no examples of the class were preserved, in particular no 97 Earl of Ulster.

Class U2 4-4-0 locomotives were based on Midland compounds and had compound equipment fitted and tablet catchers to work on single line sections. One of them is preserved at the Ulster Folk and Transport museum and is called Dunluce Castle.

Two ex-LMS Class 3F 0-6-0T Jintys were re-gauged and sent to work as shunters in Belfast renamed Class Y 0-6-0T. Maximum working boiler pressure was 160 psi(lbs).

Also Classes A1, B, B1, C, C1, D, E and E1 were all compounds. This meant they were more efficient as the steam was used twice.

DN&GR (broad gauge) 

0-6-0STs Nos 1–4, 6.

NCC narrow gauge

County Donegal (narrow gauge) 

The County Donegal Railways Joint Committee (CDRJC)

See also 
List of LNER locomotives as of 31 December 1947
Steam locomotives of British Railways

References 

 Patrick Whitehouse and David St John Thomas LMS 150: The London Midland and Scottish Railway - A Century and a Half of Progress 
 Also individual linked articles.

2
British railway-related lists